The Autodromo dell'Umbria is a  long automobile and motorcycle circuit placed in Magione, Umbria (Italy). The circuit was created in the early 1970s by the will of a group of friends.

It is featured in the video game “Assetto Corsa”.

History 
It held its inaugural race on April 7th, 1973 and hosted motorcycle races and races of the Italian F3 Championship.

Lap records

The official race lap records at the Autodromo dell'Umbria are listed as:

References

External links 
 Autodromo di Magione

Sports venues in Italy
Motorsport venues in Italy